Islamic geometric patterns are one of the major forms of Islamic ornament, which tends to avoid using figurative images, as it is forbidden to create a representation of an important Islamic figure according to many holy scriptures.

The geometric designs in Islamic art are often built on combinations of repeated squares and circles, which may be overlapped and interlaced, as can arabesques (with which they are often combined), to form intricate and complex patterns, including a wide variety of tessellations. These may constitute the entire decoration, may form a framework for floral or calligraphic embellishments, or may retreat into the background around other motifs. The complexity and variety of patterns used evolved from simple stars and lozenges in the ninth century, through a variety of 6- to 13-point patterns by the 13th century, and finally to include also 14- and 16-point stars in the sixteenth century.

Geometric patterns occur in a variety of forms in Islamic art and architecture. These include kilim carpets, Persian girih and Moroccan zellij tilework, muqarnas decorative vaulting, jali pierced stone screens, ceramics, leather, stained glass, woodwork, and metalwork.

Interest in Islamic geometric patterns is increasing in the West, both among craftsmen and artists like M. C. Escher in the twentieth century, and among mathematicians and physicists such as Peter J. Lu and Paul Steinhardt.

Background

Islamic decoration

Islamic art mostly avoids figurative images to avoid becoming objects of worship. This aniconism in Islamic culture caused artists to explore non-figural art, and created a general aesthetic shift toward mathematically-based decoration. The Islamic geometric patterns derived from simpler designs used in earlier cultures: Greek, Roman, and Sasanian. They are one of three forms of Islamic decoration, the others being the arabesque based on curving and branching plant forms, and Islamic calligraphy; all three are frequently used together.

Purpose

Authors such as Keith Critchlow argue that Islamic patterns are created to lead the viewer to an understanding of the underlying reality, rather than being mere decoration, as writers interested only in pattern sometimes imply. In Islamic culture, the patterns are believed to be the bridge to the spiritual realm, the instrument to purify the mind and the soul. David Wade states that "Much of the art of Islam, whether in architecture, ceramics, textiles or books, is the art of decoration – which is to say, of transformation." Wade argues that the aim is to transfigure, turning mosques "into lightness and pattern", while "the decorated pages of a Qur’an can become windows onto the infinite." Against this, Doris Behrens-Abouseif states in her book Beauty in Arabic Culture that a "major difference" between the philosophical thinking of Medieval Europe and the Islamic world is exactly that the concepts of the good and the beautiful are separated in Arabic culture. She argues that beauty, whether in poetry or in the visual arts, was enjoyed "for its own sake, without commitment to religious or moral criteria".

Pattern formation 

Many Islamic designs are built on squares and circles, typically repeated, overlapped and interlaced to form intricate and complex patterns. A recurring motif is the 8-pointed star, often seen in Islamic tilework; it is made of two squares, one rotated 45 degrees with respect to the other. The fourth basic shape is the polygon, including pentagons and octagons. All of these can be combined and reworked to form complicated patterns with a variety of symmetries including reflections and rotations. Such patterns can be seen as mathematical tessellations, which can extend indefinitely and thus suggest infinity. They are constructed on grids that require only ruler and compass to draw.  Artist and educator Roman Verostko argues that such constructions are in effect algorithms, making Islamic geometric patterns forerunners of modern algorithmic art.

The circle symbolizes unity and diversity in nature, and many Islamic patterns are drawn starting with a circle. For example, the decoration of the 15th-century mosque in Yazd, Persia is based on a circle, divided into six by six circles drawn around it, all touching at its centre and each touching its two neighbours' centres to form a regular hexagon. On this basis is constructed a six-pointed star surrounded by six smaller irregular hexagons to form a tessellating star pattern. This forms the basic design which is outlined in white on the wall of the mosque. That design, however, is overlaid with an intersecting tracery in blue around tiles of other colours, forming an elaborate pattern that partially conceals the original and underlying design. A similar design forms the logo of the Mohammed Ali Research Center.

One of the early Western students of Islamic patterns, Ernest Hanbury Hankin, defined a "geometrical arabesque" as a pattern formed "with the help of construction lines consisting of polygons in contact." He observed that many different combinations of polygons can be used as long as the residual spaces between the polygons are reasonably symmetrical. For example, a grid of octagons in contact has squares (of the same side as the octagons) as the residual spaces. Every octagon is the basis for an 8-point star, as seen at Akbar's tomb, Sikandra (1605–1613). Hankin considered the "skill of the Arabian artists in discovering suitable combinations of polygons .. almost astounding." He further records that if a star occurs in a corner, exactly one quarter of it should be shown; if along an edge, exactly one half of it.

The Topkapı Scroll, made in Timurid dynasty Iran in the late-15th century or beginning of the 16th century, contains 114 patterns including coloured designs for girih tilings and muqarnas quarter or semidomes.

The mathematical properties of the decorative tile and stucco patterns of the Alhambra palace in Granada, Spain have been extensively studied. Some authors have claimed on dubious grounds to have found most or all of the 17 wallpaper groups there. Moroccan geometric woodwork from the  makes use of only 5 wallpaper groups, mainly p4mm and c2mm, with p6mm and p2mm occasionally and p4gm rarely; it is claimed that the "Hasba" (measure) method of construction, which starts with n-fold rosettes, can however generate all 17 groups.

Evolution

Early stage 

The earliest geometrical forms in Islamic art were occasional isolated geometric shapes such as 8-pointed stars and lozenges containing squares. These date from 836 in the Great Mosque of Kairouan, Tunisia, and since then have spread all across the Islamic world.

Middle stage 

The next development, marking the middle stage of Islamic geometric pattern usage, was of 6- and 8-point stars, which appear in 879 at the Ibn Tulun Mosque, Cairo, and then became widespread.

A wider variety of patterns were used from the 11th century. Abstract 6- and 8-point shapes appear in the Tower of Kharaqan at Qazvin, Persia in 1067, and the Al-Juyushi Mosque, Egypt in 1085, again becoming widespread from there, though 6-point patterns are rare in Turkey.

In 1086, 7- and 10-point girih patterns (with heptagons, 5- and 6-pointed stars, triangles and irregular hexagons) appear in the Jameh Mosque of Isfahan. 10-point girih became widespread in the Islamic world, except in the Spanish Al-Andalus. Soon afterwards, sweeping 9-, 11-, and 13-point girih patterns were used in the Barsian Mosque, also in Persia, in 1098; these, like 7-point geometrical patterns, are rarely used outside Persia and central Asia.

Finally, marking the end of the middle stage, 8- and 12-point girih rosette patterns appear in the Alâeddin Mosque at Konya, Turkey in 1220, and in the Abbasid palace in Baghdad in 1230, going on to become widespread across the Islamic world.

Late stage 

The beginning of the late stage is marked by the use of simple 16-point patterns at the Hasan Sadaqah mausoleum in Cairo in 1321, and in the Alhambra in Spain in 1338–1390. These patterns are rarely found outside these two regions. More elaborate combined 16-point geometrical patterns are found in the Sultan Hassan complex in Cairo in 1363, but rarely elsewhere. Finally, 14-point patterns appear in the Jama Masjid at Fatehpur Sikri in India in 1571–1596, but in few other places.

Artforms 
Several artforms in different parts of the Islamic world make use of geometric patterns. These include ceramics, girih strapwork, jali pierced stone screens, kilim rugs, leather, metalwork, muqarnas vaulting, shakaba stained glass, woodwork, and zellij tiling.

Ceramics 

Ceramics lend themselves to circular motifs, whether radial or tangential. Bowls or plates can be decorated inside or out with radial stripes; these may be partly figurative, representing stylised leaves or flower petals, while circular bands can run around a bowl or jug. Patterns of these types were employed on Islamic ceramics from the Ayyubid period, 13th century. Radially symmetric flowers with, say, 6 petals lend themselves to increasingly stylised geometric designs which can combine geometric simplicity with recognisably naturalistic motifs, brightly coloured glazes, and a radial composition that ideally suits circular crockery. Potters often chose patterns suited to the shape of the vessel they were making. Thus an unglazed earthenware water flask from Aleppo in the shape of a vertical circle (with handles and neck above) is decorated with a ring of moulded braiding around an Arabic inscription with a small 8-petalled flower at the centre.

Girih tilings and woodwork 

Girih are elaborate interlacing patterns formed of five standardized shapes. The style is used in Persian Islamic architecture and also in decorative woodwork. Girih designs are traditionally made in different media including cut brickwork, stucco, and mosaic faience tilework. In woodwork, especially in the Safavid period, it could be applied either as lattice frames, left plain or inset with panels such as of coloured glass; or as mosaic panels used to decorate walls and ceilings, whether sacred or secular. In architecture, girih forms decorative interlaced strapwork surfaces from the 15th century to the 20th century. Most designs are based on a partially hidden geometric grid which provides a regular array of points; this is made into a pattern using 2-, 3-, 4-, and 6-fold rotational symmetries which can fill the plane. The visible pattern superimposed on the grid is also geometric, with 6-, 8-, 10- and 12-pointed stars and a variety of convex polygons, joined by straps which typically seem to weave over and under each other. The visible pattern does not coincide with the underlying construction lines of the tiling. The visible patterns and the underlying tiling represent a bridge linking the invisible to the visible, analogous to the "epistemological quest" in Islamic culture, the search for the nature of knowledge.

Jali 

Jali are pierced stone screens with regularly repeating patterns. They are characteristic of Indo-Islamic architecture, for example in the Mughal dynasty buildings at Fatehpur Sikri and the Taj Mahal. The geometric designs combine polygons such as octagons and pentagons with other shapes such as 5- and 8-pointed stars. The patterns emphasized symmetries and suggested infinity by repetition. Jali functioned as windows or room dividers, providing privacy but allowing in air and light. Jali forms a prominent element of the architecture of India. The use of perforated walls has declined with modern building standards and the need for security. Modern, simplified jali walls, for example made with pre-moulded clay or cement blocks, have been popularised by the architect Laurie Baker. Pierced windows in girih style are sometimes found elsewhere in the Islamic world, such as in windows of the Mosque of Ibn Tulun in Cairo.

Kilim 

A kilim is an Islamic flatwoven carpet (without a pile), whether for household use or a prayer mat. The pattern is made by winding the weft threads back over the warp threads when a colour boundary is reached. This technique leaves a gap or vertical slit, so kilims are sometimes called slit-woven textiles. Kilims are often decorated with geometric patterns with 2- or 4-fold mirror or rotational symmetries. Because weaving uses vertical and horizontal threads, curves are difficult to generate, and patterns are accordingly formed mainly with straight edges. Kilim patterns are often characteristic of specific regions. Kilim motifs are often symbolic as well as decorative. For example, the wolf's mouth or wolf's foot motif (Turkish: Kurt Aǧzi, Kurt İzi) expresses the tribal weavers' desires for protection of their families' flocks from wolves.

Leather 

Islamic leather is often embossed with patterns similar to those already described. Leather book covers, starting with the Quran where figurative artwork was excluded, were decorated with a combination of kufic script, medallions and geometric patterns, typically bordered by geometric braiding.

Metalwork 
Metal artefacts share the same geometric designs that are used in other forms of Islamic art. However, in the view of Hamilton Gibb, the emphasis differs: geometric patterns tend to be used for borders, and if they are in the main decorative area they are most often used in combination with other motifs such as floral designs, arabesques, animal motifs, or calligraphic script. Geometric designs in Islamic metalwork can form a grid decorated with these other motifs, or they can form the background pattern.

Even where metal objects such as bowls and dishes do not seem to have geometric decoration, still the designs, such as arabesques, are often set in octagonal compartments or arranged in concentric bands around the object. Both closed designs (which do not repeat) and open or repetitive patterns are used. Patterns such as interlaced six-pointed stars were especially popular from the 12th century. Eva Baer notes that while this design was essentially simple, it was elaborated by metalworkers into intricate patterns interlaced with arabesques, sometimes organised around further basic Islamic patterns, such as the hexagonal pattern of six overlapping circles.

Muqarnas 

Muqarnas are elaborately carved ceilings to semi-domes, often used in mosques. They are typically made of stucco (and thus do not have a structural function), but can also be of wood, brick, and stone. They are characteristic of Islamic architecture of the Middle Ages from Spain and Morocco in the west to Persia in the east. Architecturally they form multiple tiers of squinches, diminishing in size as they rise. They are often elaborately decorated.

Stained glass 

Geometrically patterned stained glass is used in a variety of settings in Islamic architecture. It is found in the surviving summer residence of the Palace of Shaki Khans, Azerbaijan, constructed in 1797. Patterns in the "shabaka" windows include 6-, 8-, and 12-point stars. These wood-framed decorative windows are distinctive features of the palace's architecture. Shabaka are still constructed the traditional way in Sheki in the 21st century. Traditions of stained glass set in wooden frames (not lead as in Europe) survive in workshops in Iran as well as Azerbaijan. Glazed windows set in stucco arranged in girih-like patterns are found both in Turkey and the Arab lands; a late example, without the traditional balance of design elements, was made in Tunisia for the International Colonial Exhibition in Amsterdam in 1883. The old city of Sana'a in Yemen has stained glass windows in its tall buildings.

Zellij

Zellij is geometric tilework with glazed terracotta tiles set into plaster, forming colourful mosaic patterns including regular and semiregular tessellations. The tradition is characteristic of Morocco, but is also found in Moorish Spain. Zellij is used to decorate mosques, public buildings and wealthy private houses.

Illustrations

Outside Islamic art

In Western culture 

It is sometimes supposed in Western society that mistakes in repetitive Islamic patterns such as those on carpets were intentionally introduced as a show of humility by artists who believed only Allah can produce perfection, but this theory is denied.

Major Western collections hold many objects of widely varying materials with Islamic geometric patterns. The Victoria and Albert Museum in London holds at least 283 such objects, of materials including wallpaper, carved wood, inlaid wood, tin- or lead-glazed earthenware, brass, stucco, glass, woven silk, ivory, and pen or pencil drawings. The Metropolitan Museum of Art in New York has among other relevant holdings 124 mediaeval (1000–1400 A.D.) objects bearing Islamic geometric patterns, including a pair of Egyptian minbar (pulpit) doors almost 2 m. high in rosewood and mulberry inlaid with ivory and ebony; and an entire mihrab (prayer niche) from Isfahan, decorated with polychrome mosaic, and weighing over 2,000 kg.

Islamic decoration and craftsmanship had a significant influence on Western art when Venetian merchants brought goods of many types back to Italy from the 14th century onwards.

The Dutch artist M. C. Escher was inspired by the Alhambra's intricate decorative designs to study the mathematics of tessellation, transforming his style and influencing the rest of his artistic career. In his own words it was "the richest source of inspiration I have ever tapped."

Influence on the sciences
Cultural organisations such as the Mathematical Sciences Research Institute and the Institute for Advanced Study run events on geometric patterns and related aspects of Islamic art. In 2013 the Istanbul Center of Design and the Ensar Foundation ran what they claimed was the first ever symposium of Islamic Arts and Geometric Patterns, in Istanbul. The panel included the experts on Islamic geometric pattern Carol Bier, Jay Bonner, Eric Broug, Hacali Necefoğlu and Reza Sarhangi. In Britain, The Prince's School of Traditional Arts runs a range of courses in Islamic art including geometry, calligraphy, and arabesque (vegetal forms), tile-making, and plaster carving.

Computer graphics and computer-aided manufacturing make it possible to design and produce Islamic geometric patterns effectively and economically. Craig S. Kaplan explains and illustrates in his Ph.D. thesis how Islamic star patterns can be generated algorithmically.

Two physicists, Peter J. Lu and Paul Steinhardt, attracted controversy in 2007 by claiming that girih designs such as that used on the Darb-e Imam shrine in Isfahan were able to create quasi-periodic tilings resembling those discovered by Roger Penrose in 1973. They showed that rather than the traditional ruler and compass construction, it was possible to create girih designs using a set of five "girih tiles", all equilateral polygons, secondarily decorated with lines (for the strapwork).

In 2016, Ahmad Rafsanjani described the use of Islamic geometric patterns from tomb towers in Iran to create auxetic materials from perforated rubber sheets. These are stable in either a contracted or an expanded state, and can switch between the two, which might be useful for surgical stents or for spacecraft components. When a conventional material is stretched along one axis, it contracts along other axes (at right angles to the stretch). But auxetic materials expand at right angles to the pull. The internal structure that enables this unusual behaviour is inspired by two of the 70 Islamic patterns that Rafsanjani noted on the tomb towers.

Notes

References

External links 

 Museum with no Frontiers: Geometric Decoration
 Victoria and Albert Museum: Teachers' resource: Maths and Islamic art & design

Islamic architectural elements
Islamic art
Mathematics in the medieval Islamic world